Richard John Lucas (born April 15, 1938) is a former American football quarterback.  He played college football at Pennsylvania State University from 1957 to 1959 and professionally in the American Football League (AFL) with the  Buffalo Bills from 1960 to 1961 and the Denver Broncos in 1962.

Lucas was born in Glassport, Pennsylvania.  He is of Russian descent. Nicknamed "Riverboat Richie" due to his gambling instincts when calling plays, Lucas won the Maxwell Award and was runner-up to LSU's Billy Cannon for the Heisman Trophy in 1959.

Lucas was a first round pick in both the 1960 NFL draft and the 1960 American Football League draft.  Lucas signed with the Buffalo Bills of the newly-formed AFL, making him officially the franchise's first player. There he played quarterback, halfback, defensive back and kick returner for two seasons. He was obtained by the AFL's Denver Broncos following the 1962 equalization draft, but never played for the Broncos.

Lucas returned to Penn State following his pro football career, serving as assistant athletic director until 1998.  He was inducted into the College Football Hall of Fame in 1986.

See also
 List of American Football League players

References

External links
 
 

1938 births
Living people
American football defensive backs
American football halfbacks
American football quarterbacks
Buffalo Bills players
Denver Broncos (AFL) players
Penn State Nittany Lions football players
All-American college football players
College Football Hall of Fame inductees
Maxwell Award winners
People from Glassport, Pennsylvania
Players of American football from Pennsylvania
American people of Russian descent
American Football League players